Alevtina Kovalenko (born September 9, 1980) is a Russian bobsledder who has competed since 2005. Her best finish in the Bobsleigh World Cup was fifth in the two-woman event at Winterberg in February 2007.

Kovalenko's best finish at the FIBT World Championships was ninth in the two-woman event at St. Moritz in 2007.

References
FIBT profile

1980 births
Living people
Russian female bobsledders
Place of birth missing (living people)